Guerilla Opera is an opera company in Boston, Massachusetts founded in 2007 specializing in accessible contemporary chamber operas, several of which have been commissioned by the company. In 2010, its Artistic Directors were Mike Williams and Rudolf Rojahn, its General Manager was Aliana de la Guardia and its director of design and production was Julia Noulin-Mérat. Guerilla Opera performed in the Zack Box Theater at the Boston Conservatory, where it is a resident ensemble. , its Artistic Directors are Julia Noulin-Mérat and Aliana de la Guardia. Guerilla Opera performs in Boston.

Productions

 September 2009
Say It Ain't So, Joe by Curtis K. Hughes (adapted from public records of the 2008 United States vice-presidential debate)
 directed by Nathan Troup
 set design by Julia Noulin-Merat,
 September 2010
Heart of a Dog by Rudolf Rojahn (adapted from the novella by Mikhail Bulgakov)
 directed by Copeland Woodruff
 set design by Julia Noulin-Merat, lights by Tlaloc Lopez-Waterman, costumes by Neil Fortin
 September 2011
 Loose, Wet, Perforated by Nicholas Vines
 directed by Jeremy Bloom
 set design by Julia Noulin-Merat, lights by Christopher Brusberg, costumes by Neil Fortin
 May 2012
 Bovinus Rex by Rudolf Rojahn
 directed by Copeland Woodruff
 set design by Julia Noulin-Merat, lights by Tlaloc Lopez-Waterman, costumes by Neil Fortin
 May 2013
 Giver of Light by Adam Roberts (libretto Adam Roberts)
 directed by Andrew Eggert
 set design by Julia Noulin-Merat, lights by Tlaloc Lopez-Waterman, costumes by Neil Fortin
 September 2014
 No Exit by Andy Vores
 directed by Nathan Troup
 set design by Julia Noulin-Merat, lights by Daniel Chapman, costumes by Lara De Brujin
 May 2014
 "Gallo" by Ken Ueno
 directed by Sarah Meyers
 set design by Julia Noulin-Merat, lights and video by Tlaloc Lopez-Waterman, costumes by Annie Simon
 September 2014
 "Let's Make A Sandwich" two chamber operas
 "Rarebit" by Curtis K. Hughes
 Ouroboros by Rudolf Rojahn
 directed by Copeland Woodruff and Giselle Ty
 set design by Julia Noulin-Merat, lights and video by Tlaloc Lopez-Waterman, costumes by Neil Fortin
 May 2015
 Pedr Solis by Per Bloland (libretto Paul Schick)
 directed by Laine Rettmer
 set design by Julia Noulin-Merat, lights by Daniel Chapman, costumes by Neil Fortin
 September 2015
 Troubled Water by Mischa Salkind-Pearl (libretto Frederick Choi)
 directed by Allegra Libonati
 set design by Julia Noulin-Merat, lights by Daniel Chapman, costumes by Neil Fortin
 May 2016
 Beowulf by Hannah Lash
 directed by Andrew Eggert
 set design by Julia Noulin-Merat, lights by Daniel Chapman, costumes by Neil Fortin
 October 2017
 Loose, Wet, Perforated by Nicholas Vines
 directed by Nichola O'Leary
 set design by Julia Noulin-Merat, lights by Keithlyn Parkman.
 May 2019
Rumpelstiltskin by Marti Epstein
 concert at the Opera America National Center, video animation by Deniz Khateri, lights by Keithlyn Parkman.

Awards and recognition
2018- Opera America - Innovation Grant

2015- Arts Impulse - Best Opera Production "Gallo"

2015- Boston Classical Review - Best World Premiere :Troubled Water"

See also

 Boston Lyric Opera
 Opera Boston
 Boston Opera Collaborative
 Opera Company of Boston
 Odyssey Opera

References

External links
Official website
Official YouTube channel
 Opera America
http://noulinmeratstudio.com/pedr-solis

Opera companies in Boston
Musical groups established in 2007
2007 establishments in Massachusetts